"Hay" is a song written and performed by American hip hop group Crucial Conflict, released as the lead single from their debut full-length album The Final Tic. It was recorded at The Barn in Chicago, Illinois and produced by member Wildstyle, who used a sampled of Funkadelic's "I'll Stay". "Hay" became the group's breakthrough hit, peaking at number 18 in the United States and number 3 in New Zealand. The single was certified gold by the RIAA on July 18, 1996, and helped the album reach gold status less than two months later. Complex placed the song at number 4 on their 50 Greatest Chicago Rap Songs.

Track listing

Personnel
Wondosas "Kilo" Martin – songwriter, vocals
Marrico "Never" King – songwriter, vocals
Corey "Coldhard" Johnson – songwriter, vocals
Ralph "Wildstyle" Leverston – songwriter, vocals, producer, engineering
Fred Brathwaite – executive producer
Roy "Black Prince" Cormier – executive producer
Shorty Capone – executive producer
Andrew Griffin – assistant engineering (track 1)
QBall – assistant engineering (track 3)
Chris Shepherd – mixing (track 1)
Ron Lowe – mixing (track 3)
Tom Carlyle – mixing (track 3)
Dennis Ferrante – mastering
Daniel Hastings – photography
Miguel Rivera – design

Chart history

Weekly charts

Year-end charts

Certifications

References

External links

1996 songs
1996 debut singles
Crucial Conflict songs
Universal Records singles
Songs about cannabis